Georgia National Cemetery is a United States National Cemetery located near the city of Canton, in Cherokee County, Georgia. Managed by the United States Department of Veterans Affairs, it encompasses , and has been undergoing development with the intention of servicing the interment needs of United States military veterans and their families for the next fifty years.

History 
The land for the cemetery was donated by land developer and World War II veteran, Scott Hudgens. J. M. Wilkerson Construction Company, Inc. was hired to develop the land. The cemetery opened for interments on April 24, 2006 with space available for nearly 30,000 grave sites. As of 2014, more than 8,000 were interred on the site. According to Findagrave.com, the cemetery is the final resting place for 27,685 veterans as of April 2022.

Notable interments 

 Ji-Tu Cumbuka - Actor
Walter Victor - Photographer

References

External links 

 National Cemetery Administration
 Georgia National Cemetery
 
 

2006 establishments in Georgia (U.S. state)
Cemeteries in Georgia (U.S. state)
Protected areas of Cherokee County, Georgia
United States national cemeteries